Buhl may refer to:

Places

France
 Buhl, Bas-Rhin
 Buhl, Haut-Rhin
 Buhl-Lorraine, Moselle

Germany
 Bühl (disambiguation)

United States
 Buhl, Alabama
 Buhl, Idaho
 Buhl, Minnesota

People
 Angie Buhl, American politician
 Bob Buhl (1928–2001), American baseball player
 Christian H. Buhl (1810–1894), American politician and businessman
 Frederick Buhl (1806–1890), American politician and businessman
 Hermann Buhl, (1924–1957), Austrian climber
 Klara Bühl (born 2000), German footballer
 Ludwig von Buhl (1816–1880), German pathologist
 Melissa Buhl (born 1982), American racing cyclist
 Philipp Buhl (born 1989), German competitive sailor
 Robbie Buhl (born 1963), American race car driver
 Vilhelm Buhl (1881–1954), Prime Minister of Denmark

Other uses
 Buhl Aircraft Company
 Buhl Altarpiece in Buhl, Haut-Rhin
 Buhl Building, in Detroit, Michigan
 Buhl Building (Pittsburgh, Pennsylvania)

See also
 Buhl Airster (disambiguation)
 Bühl (disambiguation)
 
 Buhla, Thuringia, Germany
 Buhle, a surname